Athanasius II (died 29 May 1453) is reckoned as the last Ecumenical Patriarch of Constantinople before the Fall of Constantinople. Athanasius purportedly served as patriarch from 1450 to 1453, but the only document indicating his existence is "Acts of the council in Hagia Sophia"—widely considered a forgery due to the presence of anachronisms in the text. Contemporary scholars dispute his existence, then, suggesting that the unionist patriarch Gregory III of Constantinople, residing in Rome from 1451 on, remained the city's nominal patriarch through the Ottoman capture of the city.

References

1453 deaths
15th-century patriarchs of Constantinople
People whose existence is disputed
Year of birth unknown